Pekajik (also Romanized as Pekājīk; Armenian: Պայաջուկ (Payajuk) - historically Armenian village in Zulachay Rural District, in the Central District of Salmas County, West Azerbaijan Province, Iran. At the 2006 census, its population was 441, in 109 families.

References 

Populated places in Salmas County